Tahmasababad (also Romanized as Ţahmāsabābād; also known as Ţahmāsābād) is a village in Soltaniyeh Rural District, Soltaniyeh District, Abhar County, Zanjan Province, Iran. At the 2006 census, its population was 137, in 29 families.

References 

Populated places in Abhar County